Re D’Jan of London Ltd [1994] 1 BCLC 561 is a leading English company law case, concerning a director's duty of care and skill, whose main precedent is now codified under s 174 of the Companies Act 2006. The case was decided under the older Companies Act 1985.

Facts
Without reading it, Mr D'Jan signed a change to an insurance policy which was erroneously filled out by his insurance broker, a Mr Tarik Shenyuz. He did not read it before he signed, and it contained a mistake, which was that the answer 'no' was given to the question of whether in the past he had 'been director of any company which went into liquidation'. This meant the insurance company, Guardian Royal Exchange Assurance plc, could refuse to pay up when a fire at the company’s Cornwall premises destroyed £174,000 of stock. The company had gone into insolvent liquidation by the time Mr D'Jan realised that the form had been incorrectly completed. The liquidators sued Mr D'Jan to recoup the lost funds on behalf of the company's creditors (who together were owed £500,000). They alleged both negligence and misfeasance under s 212 of the Insolvency Act 1986.

Judgment
Hoffmann LJ, sitting as a judge of first instance, held that failing even to read the form was negligent, even though it may be common practice, but that Mr D'Jan's liability should be reduced because as majority shareholder and debtor it was primarily his own money that he risked, rather than other people's. The duty of care owed by directors in section 214 Insolvency Act 1986 was an accurate statement of the common law duty also (now codified in Companies Act 2006 section 174). Because Mr D’Jan held 99 and his wife 1 out of the 100, Mr D'Jan pleaded that in accordance with the principle of the Multinational Gas and Petrochemical Co v Multinational Gas and Petrochemical Services Ltd, that shareholders all acting by consensus bind the company's actions, his actions were ratified by the company and he should not be liable. Hoffmann LJ held that actual ratification is required, not just a likelihood that shareholders would ratify. However owning 99 shares was relevant to the court’s exercise of discretion to relieve directors for breaches of duty under section 727 of the Companies Act 1985 (now section 1157 of the Companies Act 2006) because it ‘may be reasonable to take a risk in relation to your own money which would be unreasonable in relation to someone else’s.’ His judgment went as follows.

See also
Re Cardiff Savings Bank [1892] 2 Ch 100 (The "Marquess of Bute's Case") an older case on the subject
Re City Equitable Fire Insurance Co [1925] Ch 407
Bishopsgate Investment Management Ltd v Maxwell (No 2) [1993] BCLC 814
English tort law
Companies law

Notes

United Kingdom company case law

English tort case law
1994 in case law
1994 in British law
High Court of Justice cases